Östgöta Wing, also F 3 Malmslätt, or simply F 3, is a former Swedish Air Force wing with the main base located at Malmen air base near Linköping in south-eastern Sweden.

History
In August 1912, the first pilot school in Sweden was set up at Malmslätt by Carl Gustav Cederström at the location of the 1st Life Grenadier Regiment (I 4). In 1927, that regiment merged with the 2nd Life Grenadier Regiment and moved to new garrisons in Linköping Town to give room for the newly set up 3rd Flying Corps F 3. The name was changed in 1936 to Östgöta flygflottilj (Östgöta Wing).

Initially, the corps, or wing, operated the S 1, S 6, S 16, S 17, S 18 and S 22 in reconnaissance squadrons until 1948 when it was converted to a fighter wing by converting the S 22s and replacing other reconnaissance aircraft with three squadrons of J 22s.

In 1950, F 3 received the J 28A from Bråvalla Wing (F 13) which was replaced rather quickly with J 29As in 1953. Not until 1965 were they in turn replaced by J 35Ds. One squadron was decommissioned in 1970 and the two remaining were converted to J 35Fs.

The two remaining squadrons of J 35F were moved in 1973 to Blekinge Wing (F 17) when the air wing was decommissioned. The remaining administrative part of the wing was decommissioned in 1974.

The air base was still kept active as a detachment to Bråvalla Wing (F 13) as F 13 M until 1994, to Uppland Wing (F 16) as F 16 M until 2003 and now serving as F 17 M to Blekinge Wing (F 17).

The airfield is known today as Malmen Air Base (ICAO: ESCF). It is currently home to the Swedish Air Force Museum.

Barracks and training areas
The 1st and the 2nd Life Grenadier Regiments' old training area Malmen outside Linköping was taken over and modernized, while the Swedish Air Force Maintenance Depot at Malmslätt (Centrala Flygverkstaden Malmslätt, CFM) retained the parts that belonged to the Aviation Company (Flygkompaniet). The old training heath was the airfield. When the jet fighters were introduced, the first runway was built in an east-west direction. A northbound crossing runway was built in 1969 and became the main runway.

Heraldry and traditions

Coat of arms
Blazon: "Gules, the provincial badge of Östergötland, a griffin segreant or with dragonwing and tail, armed and langued azure between four roses argent".

Colours, standards and guidons
A colour was presented on 6 June 1939 at F 8 at Barkarby Airport by His Majesty the King Gustaf V. It was transferred to F 13 in 1974 and is today preserved at the Swedish Army Museum. Blazon: "On blue cloth in the centre the badge of the Air Force; a winged two-bladed propeller under a royal crown proper. In the first corner a griffin segreant or with dragonwing and tail, armed and langued gules between four roses argent".

Commanding officers
Commanding officers from 1926 to 1974. The commanding officer was referred to as flottiljchef ("wing commander") and had the rank of colonel.

1926–1926: Gösta von Porat
1926–1932: Emil Björnberg
1932–1934: Axel Gyllenkrok
1934–1941: Gösta von Porat
1941–1951: Hugo Beckhammar
1951–1952: Lennart Peyron
1952–1959: Nils-Magnus von Arbin
1959–1962: Åke Sundqvist
1962–1965: Bengt Rosenius
1965–1971: Olof Knutsson
1971–1974: Gösta Norrbohm

Names, designations and locations

See also
 List of military aircraft of Sweden
 Swedish Air Force Museum
 wikimapia

Footnotes

References

Notes

Print

Web

Further reading

External links

Webpage listing all air force squadrons in Sweden (in Swedish)

Wings of the Swedish Air Force
Military units and formations established in 1926
Military units and formations disestablished in 1974
1926 establishments in Sweden
1974 disestablishments in Sweden
Linköping Garrison